The Supreme Constitutional Court (Al-Mahkamah al-Dustūrīyah al-‘Ulyā) is the highest jurisdictional authority in the Syrian Arab Republic.

History
The Supreme Court was established under the Syrian Constitution of 1973 to adjudicate electoral disputes, rule on the constitutionality of a law or decree challenged by the prime minister or People's Council, and to render opinions on the constitutionality of bills, decrees, and regulations when requested to do so by the prime minister. 

The High Constitutional Court is forbidden, however, to question the validity of the popularly approved "laws submitted by the President of the Republic to popular referendums." The court consists of the president and four judges he appoints to serve a renewable term of four years.

Composition
The Supreme Court consists of its president called the President of the Supreme Court and 10 ordinary member judges. Judges of the Supreme Court are appointed by the President. 

Syrian Constitution of 2012 declares the judiciary independent, and assigns the President (and the Supreme Judicial Council, which the President heads) as the protector of judicial independence (Arts. 132-133).

The Supreme Constitutional Court was extended from five members to at least seven members, but all are still appointed by presidential decree (Art. 141). Constitutional Court members continue to serve four-year renewable terms (Art. 143).

Current membership (May 2021)
The President of the Supreme Court: Mr. Justice Mohammad Jihad al-Laham 
Mr. Justice Bashir Ibrahim Debbas
Mr. Justice Raslan Ali Trabelsi
Mr. Justice Malik Kamal Sharaf
Mrs. Justice Jamila Muslim Al-Sharbaji
Mr. Justice Dr. Saeed Abdel Wahid Nahaili
Mr. Justice Afif Michail Nassif
Mr. Justice Majid Rashid Khadra
Mr. Justice Muhammad Nawwaf Muhammad Anwar Hamadeh
Mrs. Justice Salwa Kadeb
Mr. Justice Mutasim Skeiker

Competences
 Deciding the constitutionality of laws and regulations
 Delivering opinions on the constitutionality of draft laws and legislative decrees upon request by the President
 Supervising presidential elections
 Considering challenges to presidential and legislative elections
 Trying the President in the case of high treason
 Constitutional review over laws passed by referendum
 Expressing opinions on the constitutionality of draft laws upon request

See also
Judiciary of Syria
High Judicial Council
Syrian Constitution
Syrian Constitution of 1973

References

Government of Syria
Syria
Judiciary of Syria